Liberation Movement is a music and art collective founded in 2010 by Resurrector (Grant Chambers) in San Francisco, CA. Liberation Movement evolved out of San Francisco-based underground music project Heavyweight Dub Champion. The collective has become known for its live performances and as of 2020 has not officially released any recorded material. They have performed at many music festivals throughout the Americas. Reality Sandwich calls Liberation Movement "a new collaborative music project that pushes the boundaries of human experience". Jambase described their 2013 Symbiosis Gathering performance as "one of the most moving, mind-blowing musical experiences in recent memory."

Formation

Liberation Movement was created among a wide variety of ambitious goals : "to bring greater appreciation for process", "to redefine the way our culture relates to age and wisdom", and "to truly generate the possibility of personal and collective evolution". Chambers explains in an interview with Reality Sandwich:

He says he chose the name because "speaking the name is a revolutionary potential in and of itself.

Peruvian Connection
In 2010, Chambers "went to Peru to learn about how music and vibration are connected to shamanism". This led to him recording more than 25 indigenous singers from the Shipibo Tribe at the Temple Of The Way Of Light near Iquitos, Peru and produce and release the album Onáyabaon Bewá - Messages from Mother Earth by Shamans of the Temple of the Way of Light. This experience also led to a rebranding of Liberation Movement.

In 2014, in collaboration with Peruvian-based NGO Alianza Arkana and the Rubin Foundation, he returned to Peru with bandmates Sasha Rose, Noah King and filmmakers Mitch Schultz (Writer/Director of DMT: The Spirit Molecule), Donald Schultz and Jason Gamble Harter to document a 3-week journey to the Peruvian Amazon.

"Jiwexon Axebo" Concert in Pucallpa

Liberation Movement teamed up with Alianza Arkana and ORAU (the regional political organization of the National Federation of Amazonian Indigenous Peoples) on a concert event held in Pucallpa, Peru called "Jiwexon Axebo" in the Shipibo Tribe's language and "Cultural Revival" in English. The Shipibo traditional singers Maestro Diogenes Garcia and Maestro Olivia Arevalo performed with Liberation Movement.

Olivia Arévalo Lomas

Often heralded as the leader and "spiritual mother" of the indigenous Shipibo-konibo community, Maestra Olivia Arévalo Lomas who both performed and recorded with Liberation Movement was tragically murdered in April 2018 at her home. She is featured on the Resurrector produced album Onáyabaon Bewá – Messages from Mother Earth.

Live Performance

Liberation Movement has received many accolades for its live performances and they have performed at festivals including Lightning in a Bottle, Symbiosis Gathering, Sonic Bloom, Joshua Tree Music Festival, Envision in Costa Rica, Atmosphere Gathering in Canada and many others. A review by Everfest of their performance at the Oregon Eclipse Festival in 2017 stated that Liberation Movement "shone brightest among the Earth Stage's magnificent programming ... Resurrector himself, Grant Chambers, provided a veritable séance in deep dubby beat-science ... This was a spiritualized journey that burrowed many thousands of leagues beneath the Earth's surface, penetrating the consciousness of all who had assembled."

Liberation Movement live performances often feature a wide variety of collaborators and guests from varied genres including Peruvian shamans, champion Tuvan throat singer Soriah, Butoh dance troupe Bad Unkl Sista, SORNE and many others.

Collaborators and Guest Performers
Liberation Movement is a collective conglomerate with a massive variety of contributors.

Grant Chambers (Resurrector ) – production, songwriting, keyboards, live PA 
 Noah King – vocals, songwriting
 Sasha Rose – vocals, keyboards, production, songwriting 
 James Small – drums
 El Suchi - guitar, vocals
 Soriah - throat singing, Tuvan instruments 
 Lux Moderna - production, songwriting, vocals
 Olivia Ruff - vocals 
 Wailer B - vocals 
 Vir McCoy - guimbri, guitar
 Oz Fritz - engineer
 Kēvens - vocals
 Brandon Farmer - live drums
 Amy Secada - dance
 Ganga Giri - didgeridoo
 Ka Amorastreyu - dance
 Bad Unkl Sista - Butoh
 Pym - production
 Skip Burton - bass 
 Evan Fraser - studio musician
 MC Azeem - spoken word
 Stero-Lion - vocals
 Dr. Israel - vocals
 Moldover - Robocaster
 Liquid Stranger - production collaborator
 Hector Becerra - drums
 Inkx Herman - drums
 Kyrstyn Pixton - vocals, songwriting
 SORNE - guest vocals
 Elf Tranzporter - vocals
 Dr. Paul Roberts - voiceover 
 Dakini Star - vocals
 Jillian Ann - vocals, songwriting
 Totter Todd - saxophone
 Plantrae - viola
 Stunami - live visual artist, graphic design
 Mitch Schultz - filmmaker
 Donald Schultz - filmmaker
 Shane Beresford - graphic & symbolic designer
 Shipibo Collaborators - Maestro Diogenes, Maestra Olivia, Maestro Sui, Maestro Jorge, Maestra Rosa, Maestra Maria, Maestro Antonio
 Q'ero Collaborator - Juan Gabriel

Notes

External links
 Liberation Movement Official Site
 Liberation Movement Youtube Channel

Electronic music groups from California
American hip hop groups
Underground culture
Experimental musical groups
Musical groups from San Francisco
Trip hop groups
American reggae musical groups
Dub musical groups